Fissurella radiosa is a species of sea snail, a marine gastropod mollusk in the family Fissurellidae, the keyhole limpets.

Two subspecies : 
 Fissurella radiosa radiosa Lesson, 1831 (represented as Fissurella radiosa Lesson, 1831)
 Fissurella radiosa tixierae Métivier, 1969

Description
The size of an adult shell varies between 18 mm and 55 mm.

Distribution
This species occurs in the Atlantic Ocean off the Falkland islands and the Straits of Magellan of Argentina and Tierra del Fuego.

Gallery

References

External links
 Philippi, [R. A. (1845). Diagnosen einiger neuen Conchylien. Archiv für Naturgeschichte. 11: 50-71]
  McLean J.H. (1984) Systematics of Fissurella in the Peruvian and Magellanic faunal provinces (Gastropoda: Prosobranchia). Contributions in Science, Natural History Museum of Los Angeles County 354: 1–70. (29 October 1984 
 Griffiths, H.J.; Linse, K.; Crame, J.A. (2003). SOMBASE - Southern Ocean mollusc database: a tool for biogeographic analysis in diversity and evolution. Organisms Diversity and Evolution. 3: 207-213
 

Fissurellidae
Gastropods described in 1831
Taxa named by René Lesson